Ranna is a river of Bavaria, Germany and of Upper Austria, Austria.

The Ranna springs southeast of Sonnen in Bavaria. It discharges at Rannamühl (Pfarrkirchen im Mühlkreis) from the left into the Danube.

See also
List of rivers of Bavaria
List of rivers of Austria

References

Rivers of Bavaria
Rivers of Upper Austria
Rivers of Austria
Rivers of Germany
Austria–Germany border
International rivers of Europe
Border rivers